is a Japanese football player who will play for Criacao Shinjuku from 2023.

Career
On 8 January 2019, Ishii joined Iwate Grulla Morioka. He left the club on 2022, after a three-year stint at Morioka.

On 24 November 2022, Ishii transferred to JFL club Criacao Shinjuku to play at the club from the 2023 season.

Career statistics
Updated to the end of the 2022 season.

Club

Other games

References

External links
Profile at Yokohama FC
Profile at Football Lab

1995 births
Living people
Association football people from Kanagawa Prefecture
Japanese footballers
J2 League players
J3 League players
Japan Football League players
Yokohama FC players
Iwate Grulla Morioka players
J.League U-22 Selection players
Criacao Shinjuku players
Association football midfielders